The Korean Journalists' Union is a North Korean organization for journalists. Founded on 11 October 1946. it is a member of the Democratic Front for the Reunification of Korea. It is considered an important institution of the country. Membership is mandatory for all North Korean journalists. The union is led by its central committee. It is based in the capital, Pyongyang. The union has published its journal, Journalists' Anthology since 1960.

The union was a member of the now-defunct International Organization of Journalists.

Spokesman of the Korean Friendship Association, Alejandro Cao de Benós, was certified an honorary journalist of the union in 2008.

History
After its foundation in 1946,the first National journalist conference was held in a youth club in Pyongyang.and the second conference was held in the Moranbong club in 1957.Third conference was held in the party conference room in 1968, and conference was held  at the People's Palace of Culture in 1979

List of historic heads of the central committee
Lee Sung bok(1985~)
Hyon chun guk(~1995) 
Kim chol myong
Kim Song Guk(2001-Before 2007)
Choi Chilnam(2007-sometime before 2013)
Hwang Yongbo(before 2013~2014)
Cha seung soo(2014~)

See also
 Media of North Korea

References

Further reading
 

Mass media in North Korea
1946 establishments in North Korea
Organizations based in North Korea
Journalism-related professional associations